Scream Above the Sounds is the tenth studio album by Welsh rock band Stereophonics. Released on 27 October 2017 by Parlophone Records, it was produced by lead singer and guitarist Kelly Jones, along with Jim Lowe.

Background
In 2015, Stereophonics released their ninth studio album, Keep the Village Alive, and supported it with the Keep the Summer Alive Tour throughout late-spring and summer 2016. During the tour, Kelly Jones announced he would like to release the band's tenth studio album "before next summer" to commemorate the 20th anniversary of Word Gets Around, rather than release a compilation album. In February 2017, the band signed with Parlophone Records to release Scream Above The Sounds, having been on their own Stylus Records label for Graffiti on the Train and Keep the Village Alive. 

On 27 July, Stereophonics revealed the name, release date and album artwork for Scream Above the Sounds, as well as releasing the lead single "All in One Night". The single was accompanied by a video directed by Joseph Connor. "All in One Night" was inspired by Victoria and was written when the band were touring in Shanghai with Jones in a hotel due to a delayed flight. "I was in this hotel and it was basically an idea I had after watching this German film called ‘Victoria’, which is about this girl who goes into a nightclub and ends up hooking up with these three guys," Jones continued "I thought the idea of two people meeting and their life completely changing over the course of one night was quite an interesting idea."

The next single was "Caught by the Wind", which was released on 4 September 2017 along with a music video. On 20 October the band released the song "Before Anyone Knew Our Name" through their YouTube channel, and on 24 October they performed "Taken a Tumble" on Later... with Jools Holland.

Title and artwork

The cover art was designed by Graham Rounthwaite, who also designed the artwork to the band's fifth studio album Language. Sex. Violence. Other?

The title of the album was taken from a line in the single 'All In One Night'. Kelly Jones said the title of the album didn't come easy. "It’s always the last thing. Scream Above The Sounds came to me one night, we were mixing the album and the line jumped out at me."

Release
The album was released on 27 October 2017 on CD, vinyl and digital download formats, with the downloaded edition including a digital booklet. A deluxe edition was released at the same time with five bonus tracks. Two unplugged versions of previously released songs from the album – "Caught By The Wind" and "All In One Night" and three previously unreleased songs – "Never Going Down", "Drive a Thousand Miles" and "Breaking Dawn". The sticker on the deluxe CD mistakenly lists the tracks "What's All the Fuss About?" and "Would You Believe?" as singles, despite the fact that they had not been released previously.

Reception

Critical response

Scream Above the Sounds has received generally mixed reviews. At Metacritic, which assigns a weighted average rating out of 100 to reviews from mainstream critics, the album received an average score of 57 based on five reviews. John Aizlewood of Classic Rock praised the album saying "By any yardstick, this album is good work."

Commercial performance
On 3 November 2017, the album reached number two on the UK Albums Chart, debuting behind Together Again by Michael Ball and Alfie Boe, which sold 35 more copies. On 29 December 2017 the album was certified Gold in the UK for sales of 100,000.

Track listing
All tracks written by Kelly Jones; "Taken a Tumble" music co-written by Adam Zindani.

Personnel

Stereophonics
 Kelly Jones – lead vocals, guitar, piano, vocal beatbox, glockenspiel, production, mixing 
 Richard Jones – bass guitar
 Adam Zindani – guitar, backing vocals
 Jamie Morrison – drums, percussion

Technical
 Craig Silvey – mixing 
 Duncan Fuller – recording studio assistant at RAK Studios
 Nathanael Graham – mixing studio assistant at RAK Studios
 Dick Beetham – mastering

Additional
 Jim Lowe – keyboards , piano , Hammond , programming , synthesizer , production, mixing , engineering
 Jim Abbiss – programming , synthesizer , production 
 Sam Yapp – drums 
 Tony Kirkham – piano ,  piano , Hammond , keyboards 
 Gavin Fitzjohn – trumpet , flugelhorn , saxophone 
 Mikey Rowe – Harmonium 
 Dieter Limbourg – saxophone 
 UK Gospel Choir – tracks 1, 3, 4, 8, 9
 Javier Weyler – drums

Charts

Weekly charts

Year-end charts

Certifications

References

External links
 Scream Above The Sounds at Stereophonics.com

2017 albums
Stereophonics albums